Stone Sling is the 20th official game released by Philips for the Videopac console. In the United States, it was published under the title Smithereens! in 1982 for the Magnavox Odyssey² console.

The game allows for two player simultaneous gameplay where both players have a fortress as well as a catapult used to fire each other. With each hit the fortress' size decreases by a bit. However, sometimes if your aim is off, the catapult will miss the fortress and instead hit one of the opposing soldiers.

Gameplay

Stone Sling's gameplay consists of aiming the catapults at each other's fortress in a colorful environment with yellow walls, green valleys, blue mountains, and a bright blue river in between the two fortresses. As said above the game can be played among two different people with its multiplayer capabilities.

References

1981 video games
Artillery video games
Multiplayer video games
Magnavox Odyssey 2 games
Video games developed in the United States